Keith Leon Moore (5 October 1925 - 25 November 2019) was a professor  in the division of anatomy, in the faculty of Surgery, at the University of Toronto, Ontario, Canada. Moore was associate dean for Basic Medical Sciences in the university's faculty of Medicine and was Chair of Anatomy from 1976 to 1984. He was a founding member of the American Association of Clinical Anatomists (AACA) and was President of the AACA between 1989 and 1991.

Moore has co-written (with Professor Arthur F. Dalley and Professor Anne M. R. Agur) Clinically Oriented Anatomy, an English-language anatomy textbook. He also co-wrote (with Professor Anne M. R. Agur and Professor Arthur F. Dalley) Essential Clinical Anatomy.

Awards

The American Association of Clinical Anatomists awarded Moore, the previous president, with their Honored Member Award (in 1994). The American Association of Anatomists awarded him the Henry Gray/Elsevier Distinguished Educator Award in 2007 for human anatomy education in the anatomical sciences.

Further awards, appointments and honors include:

The Queens Diamond Jubilee Medal was awarded to Moore in Barrie in 2012  The Medal is awarded to those who have made significant contributions and achievements in Canada. The medal was created to mark the celebrations of the 60th anniversary of Her Majesty Queen Elizabeth II’s accession to the Throne as Queen of Canada, 2012
Member of the Canadian Association of Anatomists since 1954; Former Secretary and later President
Member of the American Association of Anatomists since 1955
Consultant in Anatomy and Embryology, Honorary Attending Staff, Children’s Hospital, Winnipeg, Manitoba, Canada 1959–1976
Member of the Advisory Board of the journal Acta Cytologica 1960–1990.
Member of the Board of Consultants of the International Academy of Gynaecological Cytology since 1961
Member of the Senate of the University of Manitoba, Winnipeg Manitoba 1966–1976
Fellow of the International Academy of Cytology (FIAC) since 1968
Member of the Executive Committee of the Senate of the University of Manitoba, Winnipeg Manitoba 1970–1976
American Medical Writers Association Award for "excellence in medical publications as represented by his book "The Developing Human" 1974
American Medical Writers Association Awarded Honourable Mention for his book Clinically Oriented Anatomy 1981
Founding member of the American Association of Clinical Anatomists; Vice President and later President 1983
J.C.B. Grant Award, the highest honour given by the Canadian Association of  Anatomists in recognition of  "meritorious and outstanding scholarly accomplishments in the field of anatomical services" 1984
Fellow of the Royal Society of Medicine (FRSM) London England 1985
Associate Editor of the Clinical Anatomy Journal since 1986
Member of the National Board of Medical Examiners of the United States of America, the first Canadian to be appointed to this prestigious board. The certificate was presented "in appreciation of the valuable contribution to the work of the board and the preparation of examinations for American and Canadian Medical schools" 1988–1992
Member of the Federative International Committee on Anatomical Terminology for 20 years, the only Canadian ever appointed to this prestigious committee. The aim of this committee is "to present the official terminology of the anatomical sciences after consultation with all 55 members of the International Federation of Associations of Anatomy, thus insuring a democratic input to the terminology". The terms are translated into several languages so that all anatomists and doctors can use the recommended terms 1989–2009
American Medical Writers Association First Place Award for medical books in the Physicians Category as represented by the book Clinically Oriented Anatomy 1993
Honoured Member of the American Association of Clinical Anatomists (AACA), the highest honour given by the association for scholarship and service. The recognition is for "outstanding contributions to the field of Clinical Anatomy, epitomized by his many textbooks on clinically- oriented gross anatomy and embryology, and many years of dedicated service to the AACA and its journal, Clinical Anatomy" 1994.
Very Eminent Professor Award in Commemoration of 100 Years of Independence of Panama and the School of Medicine Panama City, Panama 2003
Fellow of the American Association of Anatomists . This Fellowship honours distinguished members who have demonstrated excellence in science and overall contributions to the medical sciences 2008.
The University of Costa Rica, Faculty of Medicine in San Jose designated Dr. Moore as a  "Maestro De La Anatomia De America" 2008
Honoured Member of the Italian Society of Anatomy and Histology in recognition of his scientific and academic curriculum 2009
Vice President Honorary of the Pan American Academy of History of Medicine, since 2017.

Embryology in the Qur'an
In 1980, Moore was invited to Saudi Arabia to lecture on anatomy and embryology at King Abdulaziz University. While he was there, Moore was approached by the Embryology Committee of King Abdulaziz University for his assistance in reinterpreting certain verses in the Qur’an and some sayings in the Hadiths which referred to human reproduction and embryological development. Moore said that he was amazed at the scientific accuracy of some of the statements which were made in the 7th century and are reiterations from Jewish texts; mainly the Talmud and the Zohar:

For the past three years, I have worked with the Embryology Committee of King Abdulaziz University in Jeddah, Saudi Arabia, helping them reinterpret the many statements in the Qur’an, Sunnah, Kabbalah and Talmud referring to human reproduction and prenatal development. At first, I was astonished by the accuracy of the statements that were recorded in the 7th century AD, before the science of embryology was established.

Moore worked with the Embryology Committee on a comparative study of the Qur’an, the Hadith and modern embryology. The Committee presented and published several papers with Moore and others co-authoring a number of papers.
Islam Papers writes that the electron microscope reveals that:

For instance, the Holy books claims that at one point the embryo looks like a small piece of meat which can be chewed, or mudghah, and Moore consents, "by golly, it does, sorta", agreeing and signaling to the knowledge we have about the structure and appearance of the actual embryo, which actually comes into a stage where it resembles the size of a small thing which can be chewed by teeth.

A special edition of Moore's medical school textbook, The Developing Human: Clinically Oriented Embryology, was published for the Muslim world in 1983. The Developing Human: Clinically Oriented Embryology with Islamic Additions, included "pages with embryology-related Quranic verse and hadith" by co-author Abdul Majeed al-Zindani.

In 2002, Moore declined to be interviewed by the Wall Street Journal on the subject of his work on Islam, stating that "it's been ten or eleven years since I was involved in the Qur'an."

References

Bibliography

External links
Curriculum Vitae of Keith L. Moore

Canadian anatomists
1925 births
2019 deaths
Canadian biologists
Academic staff of the University of Toronto
Medical school textbook writers
Canadian expatriates in Saudi Arabia